Akinyinka Omigbodun is a Nigerian professor of Gynecology, Obstetrics and former provost of the College of Medicine, University of Ibadan.
 He served as president of the West African College of Surgeons and chair of the management board of the Consortium for Advanced Research Training in Africa (CARTA). 

His research interest is in the area of Gynecologic oncology.
He is a member of the governing council, Osun State University, appointed in 2012 by Ogbeni Rauf Aregbesola, the executive governor of Osun State.
He was a keynote speaker at a media roundatable held in Lagos, where he also presented his report on the Needs Assessment Survey for Ekiti and Nasarawa State. The survey aimed to  assist in developing action plans to address social development and reproductive health issues of Nigerian youths.

Background
Omigbodun was born in Osun State, Southwestern Nigeria.
He obtained a bachelor's degree (M.B.B. S) in medicine with distinction from the College of Medicine, University of Ibadan in June 1980. Following the completion of the compulsory one year Youth service in Nigeria, he began his residency training in Obstetrics and Gynecology in 1982. Having completed the training in 1987, he became a  Fellow of the West African College of Surgeons.

Career
In October 1997, he was appointed as  Professor of Obstetrics and Gynaecology at the University of Ibadan and in 2002, he became the Chief Coordinator of Courses at the West African College of Surgeons.

In 2012, he was elected as  fellow of the Nigerian Academy of Science, the apex academic organization in Nigeria. He was inducted into the academy, along with Professor Mojeed Olayide Abass, a Nigerian Professor of Computer science at the University of Lagos and Professor Isaac Folorunso Adewole, the immediate past Vice Chancellor of the University of Ibadan.

Awards and honours
Professor Omigbodun had received numerous awards and prizes for outstanding contributions to medicine and academics. He is a receiver of the Audrey Meyer Mars Clinical Oncology Fellowship as well as the Fellowship of the American Cancer Society.
In November 1996, he was awarded the American Society for Reproductive Medicine prize for outstanding contributions to science for the best poster presentation at the 52nd annual conference held in Boston, Massachusetts, USA.

Membership
Member, Medical and Dental Council of Nigeria (2006-2010)
Member Education Committee, Medical and Dental Council of Nigeria (2006-2010)
Member Medical and Dental Practitioners’ Disciplinary Tribunal, Medical and Dental Council of Nigeria (2006-2010)
Member, Governing Council, University of Ibadan (2006-2010)
Member, Finance and Management Committee, University College Hospital, Ibadan (2006-2010)
Member Board of Management, University College Hospital (UCH), Ibadan (2006-2010)
Member Board of Management, Osun State University Teaching Hospital, Osogbo
Member, International Agency for Cancer Research HPV Prevalence Surveys Study Group (1999-2011).
Member, Governing Council, Osun State University (2012 until date).

Selected scholarly articles

Omigbodun AO and Akanmu TI. Clinicopathologic correlates of disease stage in Nigerian cervical cancer patients J. Obstet. Gynaecol. East. Cent. Afr., 1991, 9:79-82.

References

Nigerian educational theorists
People from Osun State
Living people
University of Ibadan alumni
Nigerian gynaecologists
Nigerian obstetricians
University of Pennsylvania faculty
Nigerian oncologists
Nigerian expatriate academics in the United States
Cancer researchers
Academic staff of the University of Ibadan
Year of birth missing (living people)